Meir is a Jewish given name and surname.

Meir may also refer to:

Places
 Meir (Antwerp), Belgium, the city's pre-eminent shopping street
 Meir Park, Tel Aviv, a public park
 Meir, Egypt , a village in Upper Egypt
 Meir, Staffordshire, England, suburb of Stoke-on-Trent
 Meire Grove, Minnesota, USA
 Shalom Meir tower, a building in Tel Aviv, Israel

Arts and entertainment
 Meir (album),  a 2013 album by Norwegian rock band Kvelertak